John Henry George Newman (born 13 December 1933) is an English former football player and manager.

Born in Hereford, Herefordshire, Newman played as a central defender, beginning his career with Birmingham City in 1951 where he won the Second Division and was on the losing side in the 1956 FA Cup Final. He moved on to Leicester City and then to Plymouth Argyle, for whom he made over 300 appearances between 1960 and 1967. In 1966, he played for the Football League representative team which beat the Irish Football League 12–0 at Home Park; the Football League team contained seven of the 1966 World Cup-winning team. He then moved on to Devon rivals Exeter City, where he was made player-manager in 1969, continuing in the manager's role after he retired from playing in 1972. He moved on to Grimsby Town, gaining promotion to the Third Division, and had a largely unsuccessful eleven months in charge at Derby County, before returning to his home town to manage Hereford United. His coaching career included a spell as assistant manager to Bobby Saxton at York City.

Managerial statistics

Honours
As a player
 Birmingham City
 FA Cup: finalist 1956

References

External links
 

1933 births
Living people
Sportspeople from Hereford
English footballers
Association football defenders
Birmingham City F.C. players
Leicester City F.C. players
Plymouth Argyle F.C. players
Exeter City F.C. players
English Football League players
English football managers
Exeter City F.C. managers
Grimsby Town F.C. managers
Derby County F.C. managers
Hereford United F.C. managers
English Football League managers
FA Cup Final players
York City F.C. non-playing staff
20th-century English people